Shin Soo-ji ( born 8 January 1991) is a South Korean former rhythmic gymnast and bowler. She is the first South Korean rhythmic gymnast to qualify for all-around final at the World Championships.

Personal life 
On January 5, 2018, it was announced that Shin and former Beast member Jang Hyun-seung have been dating for approximately four months.

Career 
Shin has competed in three World Championships, she had her highest placement finishing 17th in All-around at the 2007 World Championships. She was a member of the 2008 Korean Olympic squad and qualified for the 2008 Beijing Olympics, but did not advance into the top 10 finals. Shin ended up finishing 12th at the Beijing Olympics. Shin trained in Russia at a great financial burden to her family, although in 2008 she signed a contract with Sema Sports Marketing.

Shin won the bronze medal in All-around at the 2009 Asian Championships. She was also a member of the 2010 Korean gymnastics team that took fourth place at the 2010 Asian Games in Guangzhou, China.

After retiring from competitive gymnastics, Shin worked as a commentator at the 2012 London Olympic games. Shin has also appeared on a number of Korean television shows and she has been romantically linked to Korean comedian Heo Kyung Hwan.

In 2013, Shin gained global fame for the gymnastic-style ceremonial first pitch she threw at a baseball match between the Doosan Bears and Samsung Lions at Jamsil Stadium in Seoul, which went viral on YouTube.

In September 2021, Shin entered into a contract with Treasure Hunter, which plans to produce Shin's TikTok, Instagram and YouTube content.

Filmography

Television shows

References

External links

 
 
 

1991 births
Living people
Gymnasts at the 2008 Summer Olympics
Gymnasts at the 2010 Asian Games
Olympic gymnasts of South Korea
South Korean rhythmic gymnasts
Gymnasts from Seoul
South Korean ten-pin bowling players
Asian Games competitors for South Korea
21st-century South Korean women